Toni Syarifudin (born 13 June 1991) is an Indonesian professional BMX racer. He has won silver at the 2011 Southeast Asian Games in Jakarta. Syarifudin also represented Indonesia at the 2016 Summer Olympics in the men's BMX event, being the first Indonesian to compete in the category.

2016 Summer Olympics
Syarifudin qualified for the men's BMX category in the 2016 Summer Olympics, being the first Indonesian to compete in the discipline. During the heats, he crashed and injured himself during the second run, causing a dislocated shoulder and a torn ligament. He did not start the third run, and finished seventh overall in the second heat. He did not advance to the semi-finals.

References

1991 births
Living people
Indonesian male cyclists
Olympic cyclists of Indonesia
Cyclists at the 2016 Summer Olympics
People from Surakarta
Sportspeople from Central Java
Cyclists at the 2014 Asian Games
Southeast Asian Games medalists in cycling
Southeast Asian Games silver medalists for Indonesia
Cyclists at the 2018 Asian Games
Competitors at the 2011 Southeast Asian Games
Asian Games competitors for Indonesia
Competitors at the 2019 Southeast Asian Games
20th-century Indonesian people
21st-century Indonesian people